Johanna H. 

Meijer (born 26 March 1959) is a Dutch scientist who has contributed significantly to the field of chronobiology. Meijer has made notable contributions to the understanding of the neural and molecular mechanisms of circadian pacemakers. She is known for her extensive studies of photic and non-photic effects on the mammalian circadian clocks. Notably, Meijer is the 2016 recipient of the Aschoff and Honma Prize, one of the most prestigious international prizes in the circadian research field. In addition to still unraveling neuronal mechanisms of circadian clocks and their applications to health, Meijer's lab now studies the effects of modern lifestyles on our circadian rhythm and bodily functions.

Life

Academic career 
Meijer attended Leiden University in the Netherlands, where she obtained her Master’s degree in the Department of Biology, Physics, and Medicine and her Ph.D. in Physiology. After completing her Ph.D. in 1989, Meijer became an assistant professor in the Department of Physiology at Leiden University in 1992. Here, Meijer began her work on circadian rhythms alongside  Ben Rusak. In 2001, Meijer became an associate professor at Leiden University.

Meijer continues her study of circadian rhythms and chronobiology today as a Professor and Head of Neurophysiology Group at the Leiden University Medical Center in the Netherlands and a Visiting Professor in the Department of Ophthalmology at the University of Oxford in the United Kingdom.

Scientific contributions

Neuronal network organization of the circadian clock 
Meijer is a major contributor to the topic of circadian clocks and neuronal organization. She discovered that synaptic and neural plasticity in the neuronal network of the suprachiasmatic nucleus (SCN) is required for regular seasonal adaptation of the circadian clock in animals. It was shown that in mammals, the functional integrity of the SCN is crucial to health, well-being, cognitive performance, and alertness. Aging and sleep deprivation both result in a decrease in circadian amplitude, while activities such as exercise result in an increase in the circadian amplitude. This paper discusses how the effects of aging and sleep deprivation negatively impact the SCN and work to degrade its functional integrity.
 
Additionally, Meijer and colleagues demonstrated the mechanisms behind synchronization and plasticity of the SCN circadian pacemaker which allows the circadian clock to respond to changes in the length of day. Meijer found that SCN synchronization improves with exercise and worsens with age and sleep deprivation. Studying plasticity further, Meijer and other scientists discovered that plasticity has effects on metabolism. Specifically, they found that a phase shift in one’s circadian clock due to different patterns of light exposure results in metabolic disorders and obesity.

Meijer’s studies of cryptochrome-deficient mice  (a photoreceptor which regulates entrainment by light) revealed that they show no neuronal activity in the SCN because the circadian rhythm is generated from a transcription-translation feedback loop, which includes both positive and negative feedback via certain circadian clock genes.

Light responses of the mammalian circadian system 
Applying techniques in neurophysiology to the study of circadian systems, Meijer pioneered the use of in vitro and in vivo electrophysiological recordings to characterize the neural basis of circadian light responses in the mammalian SCN. Meijer’s early studies in rodents used direct electrical recordings to map the prevalence and properties of visual SCN neurons in response to retinal light exposure. Meijer went on to characterize the baseline and light-induced activity of the mammalian SCN through long-term recordings in freely moving rats, which established the ability of the SCN to produce circadian rhythms in neural activity in vivo.

Studying pathways for light input to the SCN, Meijer found that glutamate injections in the SCN produce phase shifts in the circadian activity rhythms of hamsters similar to those induced by light exposure, providing evidence that glutamate transmission mediates photic entrainment. Building upon this finding, Meijer later demonstrated the presence of glutamate receptors within the retinohypothalamic tract of brown Norwegian rats through the use of immunogold labeling, providing molecular evidence that glutamate acts as a neurotransmitter in the transduction of photic signals to the circadian clock.

Probing the role of classical photoreceptors in photic entrainment, Meijer’s lab demonstrated that light-dependent activation of the SCN was retained in mice lacking the photopigment melanopsin (Opn4-/-) but strongly attenuated in mice lacking rods and cones (rd/rd cl). Previously, melanopsin expressed in intrinsically photosensitive retinal ganglion cells was thought to be the primary photopigment involved in light input to the circadian clock. As such, these results offered evidence for the role of classical photoreceptors in transmitting light information to the SCN, which showed that the mammalian circadian clock receives input from photopigments beyond melanopsin.

Clinical implications of circadian biology

Mood, aging, and metabolism 
Meijer’s current research aims to understand circadian disruptions associated with a wide range of health concerns, including aging, mental health, metabolic disorders, and sleep deprivation. In this domain, Meijer contributed to studies demonstrating that dopamine degradation by monoamine oxidase A is regulated by the circadian clock proteins BMAL1, NPAS2, and PER2 in mice. This finding points to a molecular connection between circadian rhythms, dopamine metabolism, and mood-related behaviors, which may suggest that circadian disruptions play a role in mood regulation.

Studies conducted by the Meijer lab helped link differences in SCN activity to age-related changes in sleep and circadian function. Through longitudinal electrical recordings in mice, Meijer’s group showed that circadian rhythms in the SCN become weaker and desynchronized with increasing age, which has been associated with amyloid aggregation in Alzheimer’s disease. These findings suggest that the deterioration of SCN activity may contribute to the circadian dysfunctions observed in Alzheimer’s disease.

Research on circadian energy metabolism in the Meijer lab helped establish the detrimental effects of a high-fat diet on metabolic gene expression in liver and adipose tissue, supporting the role of circadian alterations in the development of insulin resistance and obesity. Additionally, mouse SCN lesion experiments performed in the Meijer lab identified disruptions in circadian glucose homeostasis rhythms, corroborating observations in whole-animal knockout studies of circadian genes.

Chronopharmacology
Meijer has also been influential in understanding how medications interact with and affect the daily circadian rhythm of patients. She has studied how methylphenidate delays the circadian clock and investigated how some medications move throughout the body following a 24-hour variation. In addition, she has explored the relationship between the time of day medications are administered, such as morphine and levofloxacin, and how the body reacts differently depending on those administration times. With this understanding, she researched how certain receptors in the brain also follow a 24-hour rhythm, and specifically how medications could be more effective by taking into account the efflux of the blood–brain barrier through the cerebrospinal fluid.

Sleep and non-photic effects on the circadian pacemaker 
Meijer made significant contributions to understanding the non-photic effects on the SCN pacemaker. She found that mammalian’s sleep-wake timing is regulated by the SCN pacemaker. Meijer also studied the long-term effects of sleep deprivation in mammals. Studying the circadian response to sleep deprivation, Meijer’s group obtained the first evidence that sleep centers in the brain directly regulates activity of the SCN. By live-monitoring the SCN activity and sleep phase in rats, Meijer and colleagues demonstrated that slow-wave activity during non-rapid eye movement (NREM) sleep was associated with reduced SCN activity, whereas rapid eye movement (REM) sleep was correlated with increased SCN activity. Furthermore, the transition between NREM and REM sleep was shown to correspond to sharp alterations in SCN firing patterns. In subsequent sleep deprivation experiments, the disruption of slow-wave NREM sleep resulted in increased activity in the SCN, while REM sleep disruption decreased SCN activity. These results indicated that the SCN receives and responds to information on sleep states, although the physiological mechanisms underlying this phenomenon remain to be elucidated.

Additional to Meijer's interests in sleep, she also conducted a study on the effects of chronic caffeine consumption in mice. Her studies showed that unlike traditional conventions of how caffeine may affect sleep, chronic caffeine intake seemed to increase the amplitude of the daily sleep-wake cycle and elevate sleep pressure in mice.

Practical applications of circadian rhythms
Meijer has also been an advocate for understanding how circadian rhythms can affect various fields of study. For preterm children being held in the neonatal intensive care unit, she hopes to expand the connection between consistent light-dark cycles and how they could potentially improve the outcome of their health.  She also studied how the effect of light dark cycles can affect the temporal behavior, population dynamics and social hierarchy in mice.

In zebrafish, she expanded on how having either a proactive or reactive personality types can be connected to individual clock gene expression rhythms. She found that individuals with the proactive personality type, characterized as being more aggressive and a higher baseline metabolic rate, had a significant distinct diurnal rhythmicity in clock gene expression. In contrast, individuals with the reactive trait showed a significant lack of diurnal or nocturnal rhythmicity in those same genes.

Additionally, she has researched whether or not the action of wheel-running, commonly used in many areas of research, is stereotyped or a natural behavior. Stereotyped behaviors are characterized as repetitive, invariant, and lack a goal or function. By comparing the activity of mice in a lab, sand dunes, and an urban environment, she found that wheel running was intentional and occurred in similar rates regardless of captivity. This was confirmed even when a rewarding stimulus was removed from the experiment, as there was an increase in the fraction of mice visits versus wheel activity in non-captivity. This indicated that wheel-running is a rewarding action that mice undertake regardless of the environment they are located in.

The circadian clock in modern society 
Meijer currently leads the large nation-wide research consortium BioClock, to investigate the biological clock in day-to-day life. This BioClock consortium is a joint collaboration between 13 Dutch Universities and Universities of Applied Sciences together with governmental, semi-governmental and commercial parties. In 2020, BioClock was awarded 9.7 million Euros from the Dutch Research Council (NWO) for the Dutch National Research Agenda  program (NWA). Across 25 projects, Meijer and colleagues investigate a unique coverage of the effects of modern daily life on health. Since 80% of the world lives in a light-polluted sky and one in five works in Europe is currently engaged in some form of shift work, important cues for the biological clock have drastically and abruptly changed in the past years. These changes lead to circadian disruption of humans and animals, with large consequences for mental and physical human health, as well as fitness and the chance of survival for many species. Meijer investigates with the BioClock consortium how these challenges can be overcome by uniting experts from different disciplines with the ultimate goal to protect or even strengthen the clock to promote health, quality of life and biodiversity.

Positions and honors

Academic positions 

 2007–Present: Full Professor, Department of Physiology, LUMC, Leiden, The Netherlands.
 2013–Present: Visiting Professor, Nuffield Department of Ophthalmology and Clinical Neuroscience, Oxford University, GB.
 2001-2007: Associate Professor, Department of Physiology, LUMC, Leiden, The Netherlands.
 1992-2001: Assistant Professor, Department of Physiology, LUMC, Leiden, The Netherlands.
 2014–Present: Member of the Royal Dutch Society of Sciences.
 2012: Elected Member at Large of the Society for Research on Biological Rhythms.
 1989: Fellowship of the Royal Dutch Academy of Sciences.

Honors and awards 

 2020: Dutch National Research Agenda grant – “BioClock Consortium”.  website: www.bioclockconsortium.org
 2019: European Advanced Research Grant, ERC: “The circadian clock in day-active species: preserving our health in modern society”
 2016: Aschoff and Honma Prize in Biological Rhythm Research.
 1993: “Aschoff’s Rule, a prize for eminent contributions in Chronobiology supporting the interdisciplinary spirit of the field”.

See also 

 Light effects on circadian rhythm
 Circadian rhythm sleep disorders, including
 Advanced sleep phase disorder
 Delayed sleep phase disorder
 Non-24-hour sleep–wake disorder
 Chronotherapy
 Sleep
 Sleep deprivation

References 

21st-century Dutch biologists
Chronobiologists
Leiden University alumni
Academic staff of Leiden University
1959 births
Scientists from The Hague
Living people